Ray Boggs (December 12, 1904 in Reamsville, Kansas – November 27, 1989 in Grand Junction, Colorado), nicknamed "Lefty", was a pitcher for the 1928 Boston Braves.

Boggs was a left-handed pitcher and batter. He attended the University of Denver. He played a total of four games in his entire career.

External links

1904 births
1989 deaths
Boston Braves players
Denver Pioneers baseball players
People from Smith County, Kansas
Baseball players from Kansas